ESPN Major League Baseball (also referred to as MLB on ESPN) is an American presentation of live Major League Baseball (MLB) games on ESPN, ESPN2 and ESPN+. ESPN's MLB coverage debuted on April 9, 1990 with three Opening Day telecasts. ESPN Major League Baseball is guaranteed to remain on air until 2028. In 2014, ESPN returned to broadcasting the Major League Baseball postseason. ESPN has exclusive rights to the Wild Card Series starting in 2022.

As of 2022, ESPN holds exclusive national broadcast rights to Sunday Night Baseball. The network also airs a selected game on Opening Day.

In addition to regular-season games, ESPN also airs several spring training games per year, the All-Star Legends and Celebrity Softball Game (until 2021) and Home Run Derby played the week of the All-Star Game, and (since 2022) the entire Wild Card Series each postseason. ESPN also airs a weekly highlight show called Baseball Tonight at 7 p.m. ET on Sundays as a lead-in to Sunday Night Baseball; previously it was a daily program until 2017, when layoffs cut back the show's airing to Sundays.

ESPN Radio has also been airing Major League Baseball since 1998 (succeeding CBS Radio), broadcasting Sunday Night Baseball as well as select other regular-season games, the All-Star Game and Home Run Derby, and the entire postseason including the Wild Card Game, Division Series, League Championship Series, and World Series.

History

Since ESPN first received MLB telecast rights, it has become traditional for the network to make an effort to cover live historic moments in the sport. For example, in 2007, ESPN and ESPN2 added several telecasts when Barry Bonds chased Hank Aaron's record for most home runs in an MLB career. ESPN had the national telecasts on August 4 when Bonds tied Aaron with number 755 and on August 7, 2007 when he hit number 756. ESPN was also the broadcaster of the final game at the original Yankee Stadium as a part of Sunday Night Baseball with Jon Miller and Hall of Famer Joe Morgan. It also showed Chris Burke's 18th-inning walk-off homer to end the 2005 NLDS series in favor of the Houston Astros against the Atlanta Braves.  The St. Louis Cardinals swept the San Diego Padres in the other NLDS Series.

Also, the network has been given permission to interrupt regular programming, when allowed, to show attempts at new records or significant milestones live. Examples include three cut-ins from its coverage of the first X Games in 1995 until Eddie Murray recorded his 3000th hit, live coverage of Sammy Sosa's 600th home run in 2007, and a number of no-hitters, including the Buchholz feat mentioned earlier. Although it cannot show any historic attempts live during the Fox or TBS exclusive windows, it was allowed to show an in-progress highlight of Alex Rodriguez's 500th career home run in August 2007, as this was on a Saturday afternoon before Fox went on the air with its game coverage.

1990s
On January 5, 1989, Major League Baseball signed a $400 million deal with ESPN, who would show over 175 games beginning in 1990. For the next four years, ESPN would televise six games a week (Sunday Night Baseball, Wednesday Night Baseball and doubleheaders on Tuesdays and Fridays), as well as multiple games on Opening Day, Memorial Day, Independence Day, and Labor Day.

On April 15, 1990, ESPN's Sunday Night Baseball debuted with the experienced play-by-play announcer Jon Miller joining retired Hall of Fame player Joe Morgan in the broadcast booth. In its first year, Sunday Night Baseball averaged a 3.0 rating. That was double the number that ESPN as a whole was averaging at the time (1.5). By 1998, ESPN enjoyed its largest baseball audience ever (a 9.5 Nielsen rating) as Mark McGwire hit his 61st home run of the season. When ESPN first broadcast Sunday Night Baseball, they would show at least one game from every ballpark. Also, every team was guaranteed an appearance. It was essentially, the television equivalent to a cross country stadium tour.

In , ESPN renewed its baseball contract for six years (through the  season). The new deal was worth $42.5 million per year and $255 million overall. The deal was ultimately voided after the  season and ESPN was pretty much forced to restructure their contract. In , ESPN broadcast the American League West tie-breaker game between the Seattle Mariners and California Angels with Jon Miller and Joe Morgan making the call.

In , ESPN began a five-year contract with Major League Baseball worth $440 million and about $80 million per year. ESPN paid for the rights to a Wednesday night doubleheader and Sunday Night Baseball, as well as Opening Day and holiday telecasts and all postseason games not aired on Fox or NBC. Major League Baseball staggered the times of first-round games to provide a full-day feast for viewers: ESPN could air games at 1 p.m., 4 p.m., and 11 p.m. EDT, with the broadcast networks telecasting the prime time game.

In , ESPN broadcast the National League Wild Card tie-breaker game between the Chicago Cubs and San Francisco Giants. Like the American League West tie-breaker game in 1995, Jon Miller and Joe Morgan were on the call for ESPN.

In 1999, NBC's Bob Costas teamed with Joe Morgan to call two weekday night telecasts for ESPN. The first was on Wednesday, August 25 with Detroit Tigers playing against the Seattle Mariners. The second was on Tuesday, September 21 with the Atlanta Braves playing against the New York Mets. Later that year, ESPN broadcast the National League Wild Card tie-breaker game (this time between the New York Mets and Cincinnati Reds) with Miller and Morgan once again on the call.

2000s
The contracts with ESPN were worth $141.8 million per year and $851 million overall.

ESPN then added these games, along with the Thursday night games (subsequently shifted to weekday afternoon "DayGame" broadcasts), to its package.

2005
OLN was briefly considering picking up the rights to the Sunday and Wednesday games, which expired after the 2005 season. On September 14, 2005 however, ESPN, then the current rights holder, signed an eight-year contract with Major League Baseball, highlighted by the continuation of ESPN's Sunday Night Baseball series with additional, exclusive team appearances. The key details of the agreement were:
 Up to 80 regular-season telecasts per year;
 No blackout restrictions on exclusive Sunday Night Baseball; Monday Night Baseball, with ESPN mostly coexisting with local carriers
 Up to five appearances per team per year on the exclusive Sunday Night Baseball series, up from 11 over three years;
 Daily Baseball Tonight programs – one of ESPN's most popular series—including the continued right to show in-progress highlights and live cut-ins;
 Home Run Derby, ESPN's highest-rated program of the summer and one of cable's best, and additional All-Star programming;
 Continuation of season-long Wednesday baseball on ESPN and ESPN2;
 For the first time, the 11 p.m. ET SportsCenter will present a nightly Baseball Tonight update featuring in-progress highlights;
 Select games and MLB All-Star events on ESPN2 throughout the season;
 10 spring training games and several Opening Day games per year;
 Telecast rights for ESPN Deportes and ESPN International;
 Ability to include Major League Baseball programming as part of the delivery of the ESPN networks via cable, satellite and other new or developing technologies, such as cell phones and wireless devices;
 Archival footage and game programming and "Instant Classic" rights for ESPN Classic.
 ESPN Radio also maintains exclusive terrestrial rights.

The weekday afternoon "DayGame" telecasts that ESPN and ESPN2 had previously aired were eliminated in the new pact, along with the late (10 p.m. ET) Wednesday night game (although ESPN can elect to show a late game instead of an early one should it so desire), and the coverage of Memorial Day, Independence Day, and Labor Day games (except for games that fall under the regular Monday-night slot).

ESPN's Monday and Wednesday telecasts remain mostly nonexclusive, meaning the games also can be televised by each club's local broadcasters. In fact, Wednesday games are blacked out on ESPN unless a participating team's local broadcaster does not choose to televise the game. The Sunday games remain on ESPN only, and with ESPN losing the rights to Sunday Night Football telecasts, it looks likely that Sunday Night Baseball will run uninterrupted on ESPN throughout the season, except on Opening Night (when it will air on ESPN2, since it usually conflicts with the NCAA Women's Basketball Final Four).

Alternate telecasts for home-team markets which are blacked out have also been phased out, either in an effort to save costs or in an effort to allocate more satellite space for high-definition broadcasts on ESPNHD. Those who get ESPN via cable get ESPNEWS instead, and those who get the channel via satellite see a blank picture and a blackout notice.

MLB will receive, on average, $296 million a year under the new agreement, a television and a baseball official said, speaking on condition of anonymity because of a confidentiality agreement in the deal. ESPN will pay baseball $273.5 million in 2006, $293.5 million in each of the following four years, $308.5 million in 2011 and $306 million in each of the final two seasons.

2006
On July 25, 2006, Harold Reynolds was fired from ESPN. The ESPN spokeswoman confirmed that Reynolds "is no longer with the network" but did not give a reason for the departure. "Three people who work at ESPN and familiar with the case said the cause was a pattern of sexual harassment." Reynolds confirmed that an accusation of sexual harassment was the reason for his departure but called it "a total misunderstanding" and that "I gave a woman a hug and I felt like it was misinterpreted. In February 2008, ESPN and Reynolds reached an out-of-court settlement.

Weeks later, Peter Gammons was sidelined with a brain aneurysm. Gammons returned to ESPN in early September.
The play-by-play commentators for ESPN DayGame were Gary Thorne or Jon Sciambi, along with Steve Phillips, and Steve Stone as color analysts. The program was sponsored by Fruit of the Loom in 2006. The game generally aired on Wednesday or Thursday. The final game to date was aired on September 30, 2006.

ESPN telecasts in 2006, posted an average of 1,115,000 household impressions, up 27% when compared to 2005's 875,000. The corresponding 1.2 rating this year marks a 20% increase over the 1.0 average in 2005. ESPN2's baseball telecasts have averaged 704,000 households, an increase of 34% over 2005's 525,000. Ratings on ESPN2 went up 33% (0.8 vs. 0.6).

2007
After the 2006 Division Series, ESPN lost the rights to broadcast playoff games on TV. With the exception of ESPN being allowed to broadcast one of the two Wild Card games each year (which were added in 2012), all MLB postseason games have aired on Fox Sports and TBS since 2007. Games remained on ESPN Radio. ESPN also lost rights to ESPN DayGame presented by Fruit of the Loom and Thursday Night Baseball powered by Castrol.

Because of the reduction of ESPN's weekly schedule from five games to three, ESPN released numerous commentators from the network, including Jeff Brantley, Tino Martinez, Steve Stone and Eric Karros.

With the new deal coming into play this year, several things changed with the Monday and Wednesday night games in particular. For Monday Night Baseball, the telecast will now co-exist with teams' local carriers up to three times per year, up from two times in previous years. Wednesday Night Baseball also changed slightly. Now, in addition to the featured game that night, they will also have some live cut-ins to other games across the nation and discuss some the hot topics in the major leagues.

On April 1, for the season-opening game between the New York Mets and the St. Louis Cardinals, ESPN changed its on-screen graphics to the version that debuted with Monday Night Football in 2006 and was later adopted by its NBA coverage at the start of the 2006-07 season. The previous graphics dated back to the advent of ESPN HD in 2004.

During the week of the All-Star Game, Baseball Tonight and SportsCenter did not travel to the game site as it normally does; the 2007 site was AT&T Park in San Francisco. The reason was that MLB stripped ESPN of its on-site credentials for its studio crew as punishment for leaking the rosters of the All-Star teams before TBS did. TBS' announcement, which was billed as exclusive, was scheduled for 4 p.m. Eastern time but was delayed for nearly two hours, by which point ESPN, in apparent violation of its contract with MLB, went ahead and revealed the rosters anyway. ESPN later agreed to promote playoff coverage on TBS and Fox (alongside its own radio coverage) in return for Baseball Tonight going on the air shortly after each night's games concluded.

ESPN pre-empted part of the Kansas State–Auburn college football game on September 1 to show the end of the no-hitter thrown by Boston Red Sox pitcher Clay Buchholz.

2008
ESPN2 showed the season-opening games in Tokyo between the Boston Red Sox and the Oakland Athletics. Unfortunately, due to a transponder failure, viewers on DirecTV reliant on the standard-definition feed missed the first of the two games. (ESPNHD was unaffected.)

On March 30, ESPN showed the first-ever game at Nationals Park in Washington, D.C. The Washington Nationals defeated the Atlanta Braves on a walk-off home run by Ryan Zimmerman.

On May 4, ESPN introduced enhanced updates targeting viewers who play fantasy baseball. It shows season batting statistics for the current batter on each potential count and updates batting average and other selected stats after the at-bat concludes.

2010s

2010
The score banner was converted to a score box in the bottom right hand corner of the screen. And instead of numbers to represent the balls, strikes and outs, dots were represented for each: three green dots for balls, two yellow dots for strikes, and two red dots for outs. The pitch count was also introduced, adopted from the New York Yankees' broadcasts on the YES Network, as well as NESN for the Boston Red Sox. College baseball and softball broadcasts, however, continued to use the previous (2007) graphics for the 2010 College World Series telecasts. ESPN's coverage of the Little League World Series also retained the 2007 graphics until midway through, and then adopted the current (2010) graphics package.

Baseball Tonight, a daily highlight show aired on ESPN during the baseball season, likewise introduced new graphics adopted from SportsCenter in June 2010.

2011
The ESPN Major League Baseball score box was slightly modified beginning with the opening day game between the Detroit Tigers and the New York Yankees. Numbers indicating the ball, strike and out counts replace the dots used last year; the out dots were adopted by Fox Sports Net on their local broadcasts as well as Major League Baseball on Fox. The pitch speed and count are now fixed below the bases graphic. Also, the area around the bases graphic and ball, strike, and out counter is slightly translucent.

Beginning with the Sunday Night Baseball interleague game between the New York Yankees and the Chicago Cubs on June 19, the graphics were slightly adjusted to fit in with the 16:9 aspect ratio for HD broadcasts, similar to what Fox Saturday Baseball, Root Sports and Fox Sports Net have done for their baseball coverage. TBS would follow suit in adjusting their graphics to the 16:9 aspect ratio.

2012

The score box and other graphics were carried over from 2011, but a new logo for all ESPN MLB presentations was unveiled at the start of the season. The ESPN logo is fixed on a CGI baseball, with the words 'Major League Baseball' (or Baseball Tonight and Sunday, Monday or Wednesday Night Baseball) in a stylized neon light surrounding it. A 2-D version is also used on print ads or on secondary program IDs. The graphics would stay virtually the same for the next three seasons.

On August 28, Major League Baseball and ESPN agreed to an eight-year, $5.6 billion contract extension, the largest broadcasting deal in Major League Baseball history. It gives ESPN up to 90 regular-season games, one of the two Wild Card games which will rotate between American League and National League teams each year, and the rights to all regular-season tiebreaker games.

2015
For the 2015 season, ESPN introduced a new on-air appearance for baseball. Among its changes were a new, persistent K-Zone Live graphic, consisting of a faded white rectangle that is overlaid live atop the strike zone on the home plate camera angle at all times.  A new K-Zone 3D graphic, with ball trails and a three-dimensional box representing the strike zone, can also be used during replays. The new live K-Zone graphic was criticized by viewers and the media for being potentially distracting, drawing comparisons to baseball video games and Foxs "glowing puck" from its NHL coverage.

2017 
In the 2017 season, ESPN introduced a new camera angle known as "Front Row Cam"; it is designed to provide a "low-home" camera angle, and utilizes a cylindrical camera pointed vertically at a mirror inside an enclosure positioned along the wall behind home plate. During the American League Wild Card Game, ESPN also introduced a new "immersive" K-Zone 3D component, which allows the data to be rendered into a virtual stadium environment to be viewed at different perspectives.

2018
The 2018 season saw a revamp of ESPN's lead commentary team, with Matt Vasgersian succeeding Dan Shulman, and Alex Rodriguez joining as analyst. ESPN also anticipated increased use of the Front Row Cam on Sunday Night Baseball, and the immersive K-Zone 3D feature being employed on all games (a move enabled by ESPN's full adoption of on-site graphics and replay systems operated remotely from its main studios in Bristol). ESPN also unveiled a major on-air rebranding for its MLB coverage.

2020s
The 2020 regular season was delayed by four months due to the COVID-19 pandemic. Matt Vasgersian and Alex Rodriguez would broadcast all of ESPN's Sunday night games from a studio at their Bristol, Connecticut headquarters. Also in July 2020, Major League Baseball announced that they would be expanding the playoffs,

The 2020 postseason introduced an additional "Wild Card Series" round, featuring eight best-of-three series preceding the Division Series. ESPN acquired the rights to seven of the series, the last of which was allocated to TBS. On September 28, 2020, it was announced that ABC would carry at least four Wild Card Series games, marking ABC's first national MLB broadcast since 1995.

In 2021, ESPN renewed its rights through the 2028 season. ESPN dropped most of its weeknight broadcasts, focusing primarily on Sunday Night Baseball instead; the network continues to hold rights to at least 30 exclusive regular season games per-season, including Sunday Night Baseball and Opening Day games. ESPN also received the rights to produce alternate telecasts on its sister networks, as well as simulcasts and expanded content on ESPN+, and the ability to air selected games on ABC. The contract also gives ESPN rights to the new postseason Wild Card round; if this expansion did not occur, ESPN would have received eight additional regular season games per-season.

Technology

Through the years, ESPN has enhanced its Major League Baseball coverage with the introduction and implementation of innovative technology. Which include:
 April 1995 – ESPN debuted in-game box scores during Major League Baseball telecasts. Hitting, pitching and fielding stats from the game are shown along the bottom of the screen three times per game.
 May/June 1997 – ESPN debuted MaskCam on an umpire at the College World Series, adding it to major league coverage the following year.
 April 1998 – ESPN debuts BatTrack, which measures the bat speed of hitters.
 April 15, 2001 – ESPN Dead Center debuted on Sunday Night Baseball with Texas vs. Oakland. This new camera angle, directly behind the pitcher, is used to provide true depiction of inside/outside pitch location and is used in certain parks in conjunction with K Zone.
 July 1, 2001 – K Zone officially debuted on Sunday Night Baseball.
 April 7, 2002 – ESPN became the first network to place a microphone on a player during a regular-season baseball game. "Player Mic" was worn by Oakland catcher Ramón Hernández (who also wore "MaskCam") and taped segments were heard.
 May 26, 2002 – "UmpireCam" debuted, worn by Matt Hollowell behind the plate in the New York Yankees at Boston Red Sox telecast.
 March 30, 2003 – ESPNHD, a high-definition simulcast service of ESPN, debuted with the first regular-season MLB game of the season - Texas at Anaheim.
 April 2004 – ESPN's Sunday Night Baseball telecasts added a fantasy baseball bottom line, updating viewers on the stats for their rotisserie league players at 15 and 45 minutes after the hour.
 April 10, 2005 – "SkyCam" premiered during Sunday Night Baseball. "SkyCam" is mounted more than 20 feet above the stands in foul territory and travels down a designated base path (first or third base line, from behind home plate to the foul pole), capturing overhead views of the action. The remote-controlled camera can zoom, pan and tilt.
 April 2, 2006 – A handheld camera brings viewers closer to the action for in-game live shots of home run celebrations, managers approaching the mound and more.
 May 1, 2006 – 'K Zone 2.0' debuted on Monday Night Baseball.

Ratings

 Division Series (2003-2006)

 2003 National League Division Series
 Cubs vs Braves (game 2): 5.1 (7.4 million viewers)
 Cubs vs Braves (game 3): 5.4 (8.1 million viewers)
 2004 American League Division Series
 Twins vs Yankees (game 2): 4.7 (6.8 million viewers)
 2005 American League Division Series
 Red Sox vs White Sox (game 2): 4.4 (6.4 million viewers)
 Angels vs Yankees (game 3): 4.9 (7.2 million viewers)
 2006 American League Division Series
 Yankees vs Tigers (game 3): 4.4 (6.6 million viewers)

 Wild Card Game (2014–present)

 2014 National League Wild Card Game: 3.6 (5.6 million viewers)
 2015 American League Wild Card Game: 4.9 (7.6 million viewers)
 2016 National League Wild Card Game: 4.5 (7.4 million viewers)
 2017 American League Wild Card Game: 4.2 (6.7 million viewers)

Personalities

See also
 Major League Baseball on Fox
 Major League Baseball on TBS
 MLB Network

References

External links
 

1990 American television series debuts
2000s American television series
2010s American television series
2020s American television series
Major League Baseball
Major League Baseball
Major League Baseball on television